The Beebe Syndicate was the name given to a group of electric streetcar and interurban railroads as well as construction and finance companies that shared common management based in Syracuse, New York. Founder Clifford D. Beebe (1866–1937) had returned to New York State after building up his career in the banking industry in Michigan. His first involvement with managing electric railways was presiding over the Syracuse and East Side Railway in 1894. After several years of involvement with various local streetcar lines, Beebe turned his attention to the development of electric interurban railways. Beginning in 1899, the Beebe Syndicate grew to control 28 individual companies at its height in 1915. By this time, many properties were placed in receivership due to overwhelming debt. Large parts of the Syndicate were sold into foreclosure in 1917, with the remaining lines reorganized independently. Beebe left the Syracuse area in 1919 and moved to New York City to pursue a career in real estate. He returned to Kalamazoo, Michigan, in 1935 and died of a sudden heart attack in 1937.

Affiliated companies 

 American Light, Power and Transportation Company
 Auburn and Northern Construction Company
 Auburn and Syracuse Construction Company
 Auburn and Syracuse Electric Railroad
 Buffalo, Lockport and Rochester Railway
 Edgecliff Park Company
 Electric Terminal Association
 Empire United Railways, Inc.
 Auburn and Northern Electric Railroad (EUS)
 Rochester, Syracuse and Eastern Railroad (EUS)
 Syracuse, Lake Shore and Northern Railroad (EUS)
 Hudson Finance Company
 Inter-State Financing and Construction Company
 Interurban Publishing Company
 Monroe County Electric Belt Line
 Newark and Marion Railway
 Newark, Williamson and Northern Railroad
 Oneida Lake Terminal Company
 Onondaga Amusement Company
 Ontario Construction Company
 Rochester Belt Line
 Sagamore Navigation Company
 Skaneateles Lake Transportation Company
 Syracuse Railroad Construction Company
 Syracuse and South Bay Electric Railroad
 Syracuse Terminal Association
 Syracuse, Watertown and St. Lawrence River Railroad
 Warren Street Realty Company

Defunct New York (state) railroads
Interurban railways in New York (state)